Bignonia may refer to:
 Bignonia a genus of flowering plants in the catalpa family, Bignoniaceae
 Bignonia (grape), an Italian wine grape
 8850 Bignonia, a main-belt asteroid discovered in 1990
 USS Bignonia (1863), a steamer purchased by the Union Navy during the American Civil War